The following is a list of newspapers and news publications in Madagascar. Most are headquartered in the city of Antananarivo. As of the mid-1960s, there were "18 dailies, 48 weeklies, 60 monthlies, 10 bimonthlies, and 19 quarterlies" in publication.

Current publications

Defunct
 L'Aurore (weekly published in Mahajanga); defunct?
 Le Colon (in French)
 Courrier de Madagascar (est. 1962); defunct?
 L'Echo de Madagascar (est. 1900, in French)
 L'Echo du Sud (in French)
 L'Echo de Tananarive (in French)
 Fanilo (Catholic weekly published in Fianarantsoa); defunct?
 Ny Gazety Malagasy (government publication, est. 1883)
 KITRA
 Lumiere (Catholic weekly published in Fianarantsoa); defunct?
 Madagascar News (in English)
 Madagascar Times (in English)
 Madagascar World (in English)
 Madecasse (in French)
 Ny Mizana (monthly published in Toamasina); defunct?
 Le Quotidien
 Vaovao (est. 1900, in French)
 Ny VAOVAOntsika (daily)

See also
 List of radio stations in Madagascar
 Telecommunications in Madagascar
 Online media of Madagascar (in French)
 Literature of Madagascar

References

Bibliography

External links
 

Newspapers

Madagascar